Ernest Albert Egerton VC (10 November 1897 – 14 February 1966) was an English recipient of the Victoria Cross, the highest and most prestigious award for gallantry in the face of the enemy that can be awarded to British and Commonwealth forces.

Egerton was born on 10 November 1897. When he was 19 years old, and a Corporal in the 16th Battalion, The Sherwood Foresters (The Nottinghamshire and Derbyshire Regiment), British Army during the First World War, he was awarded the VC for his actions during the Battle of Passchendaele.

On 20 September 1917 southeast of Ypres, Belgium: ...during an attack, visibility was bad owing to fog and smoke. As a result, the two leading waves of the attack passed over certain hostile dugouts without clearing them and enemy rifles and machine-guns from these dugouts were inflicting severe casualties. Corporal Egerton at once responded to a call for volunteers to help in clearing up the situation and he dashed for the dugouts under heavy fire at short range. He shot a rifleman, a bomber and a gunner, by which time support had arrived and 29 of the enemy surrendered.

He later achieved the rank of sergeant. He served in the Home Guard in World War II and died on 14 February 1966.

His Victoria Cross is displayed at the Sherwood Foresters Museum in Nottingham Castle.

References

Monuments to Courage (David Harvey, 1999)
The Register of the Victoria Cross (This England, 1997)
VCs of the First World War - Passchendaele 1917 (Stephen Snelling, 1998)

External links
Webpage about Sergeant Egertons Life  (Staffordshire)
Location of grave and VC medal (Staffordshire)

1897 births
1966 deaths
Sherwood Foresters soldiers
British Army personnel of World War I
People from Longton, Staffordshire
British World War I recipients of the Victoria Cross
British Home Guard soldiers
North Staffordshire Regiment soldiers
British Army recipients of the Victoria Cross
Military personnel from Staffordshire